The 2009–10 Terceira Divisão season was the 60th season of the competition and the 20th season of recognised fourth-tier football in Portugal.

Overview
The league was contested by 94 teams in 8 divisions of 10 to 12 teams.

Terceira Divisão – Série A
Série A – Preliminary League Table

Série A – Promotion Group

Série A – Relegation Group

Terceira Divisão – Série B
Série B – Preliminary League Table

Série B – Promotion Group

Série B – Relegation Group

Terceira Divisão – Série C
Série C – Preliminary League Table

Série C – Promotion Group

Série C – Relegation Group

Terceira Divisão – Série D
Série D – Preliminary League Table

Série D – Promotion Group

Série D – Relegation Group

Terceira Divisão – Série E
Série E – Preliminary League Table

Série E – Promotion Group

Série E – Relegation Group

Terceira Divisão – Série F
Série F – Preliminary League Table

Série F – Promotion Group

Série F – Relegation Group

Terceira Divisão – Série Açores
Série Açores – Preliminary League Table

Série Açores – Promotion Group

Série Açores – Relegation Group

Terceira Divisão – Série Madeira
Série Madeira – Preliminary League Table

Série Madeira – Promotion Group

Série Madeira – Relegation Group

Footnotes

External links
 Portuguese Division Three – footballzz.co.uk

Portuguese Third Division seasons
Port
4